Kelly Wayne Chase (born October 25, 1967) is a Canadian former professional ice hockey player who played 458 games in the National Hockey League, and current radio sportscaster. He formerly served as the color commentator for St. Louis Blues radio broadcasts on KMOX radio in St. Louis. He is an uncle of Gregory Chase, who was drafted 188th overall by the Edmonton Oilers in the 2013 NHL Entry Draft.

Playing career
Chase played a tough, physical game that earned him a reputation as an enforcer as well as many penalty minutes, a statistic in which he led the WHL in 1987–88 while playing with the Saskatoon Blades. Before that he played with the Humboldt Broncos of the Saskatchewan Junior Hockey League.

In spite of putting up decent numbers in his last year of Major Junior Hockey with 55 points in 70 games with the Saskatoon Blades in 1987-88, all NHL teams took a pass on Chase in the 1988 Entry Draft. His significant penalty minutes (343) may have contributed to many teams' reticence on drafting a player who would take numerous penalties. However, in 1988, Chase was signed as an undrafted free agent by the St. Louis Blues, and spent the majority of the three following seasons with the Peoria Rivermen of the IHL.  Chase subsequently became a regular on the Blues' bench, with his play on the ice and quick wit off the ice earning him a spot in the hearts of Blues fans.

In 1994, Chase, along with Anthony Sansone Jr., founded and coached the Gateway Locomotives special hockey team. On March 30, 2017, the team was re-named as St. Louis Blues Special Hockey. 

In January 1995, the Hartford Whalers selected Chase in the NHL Waiver Draft.  Chase would spend most of the next three seasons with the Whalers before being traded to the Toronto Maple Leafs in 1997.  Prior to the 1997–98 season, Chase was reacquired by the Blues for future considerations.  It was at the end of that season that Chase was awarded the King Clancy Memorial Trophy for his charity work with the Gateway Special Hockey Program, a program started by Chase in the early 1990s to help those with developmental disabilities participate in organized hockey.

Chase retired from professional hockey on July 28, 2000 and was the color commentator for St. Louis Blues radio broadcasts on KMOX until 2018. On December 15, 2008, Chase was presented with the 2008 Jack Buck Award, for his enthusiasm and dedication to sports in the city of St. Louis, Mo. Chase also participated on the Canadian Broadcasting's (CBC) Battle of the Blades which is figure skating version of Dancing With The Stars in 2010.

Awards
Winner of the King Clancy Memorial Trophy, 1997–98
Recipient of 2008 Jack Buck Award by the Missouri Athletic Club

Career statistics

See also
List of NHL players with 2000 career penalty minutes

References

External links
 
 

1967 births
Living people
Battle of the Blades participants
Canadian ice hockey right wingers
Hartford Whalers players
Ice hockey people from Saskatchewan
King Clancy Memorial Trophy winners
National Hockey League broadcasters
Peoria Rivermen (IHL) players
St. Louis Blues announcers
St. Louis Blues players
Saskatoon Blades players
Toronto Maple Leafs players
Undrafted National Hockey League players